Daniel Giraldo (born 1 July 1992) is a Colombian footballer who plays for Atlético Junior as a midfielder. that he gets the best performance with 'los embajadores'

International career
Giraldo made his debut for the Colombia national team on 16 January 2022 in a 2–1 home win over Honduras.

References

External links 
Olhao Web site

1992 births
Living people
Footballers from Cali
Association football wingers
Colombian footballers
Deportivo Cali footballers
S.C. Olhanense players
Deportivo Pasto footballers
Independiente Santa Fe footballers
Categoría Primera A players
Liga Portugal 2 players
Colombian expatriate footballers
Expatriate footballers in Portugal